The 1937 Marquette Golden Avalanche football team was an American football team that represented Marquette University as an independent during the 1937 college football season. In its first season under head coach Paddy Driscoll, the team compiled a 3–6 record and was outscored by a total of 124 to 48. The team played its home games at Marquette Stadium in Milwaukee.

In February 1937, Frank Murray resigned as Marquette's head football coach after 15 years in the position; Murray left to accept the same position at the University of Virginia. Three weeks later, Marquette hired Paddy Driscoll as its new coach. Driscoll had previously played both Major League Baseball and in the National Football League; he was later inducted into both the College and Pro Football Hall of Fames.

Schedule

References

Marquette
Marquette Golden Avalanche football seasons
Marquette Golden Avalanche football